The big-headed turtle (Platysternon megacephalum) is a species of turtle in the family Platysternidae from Southeast Asia and southern China.

Background

Previously considered a distinct family placed on occasion in "Kinosternoidea", it was later moved to the Emydidae. With the Geoemydidae being split off from these, it seems wisest to reinstate the Platysternidae. This, as well as the subfamily and the genus Platysternon, are monotypic.

Distribution
The big-headed turtle is found in Cambodia, China, Laos, Myanmar, Thailand, and Vietnam.

Behaviour

The big-headed turtle is known to readily climb over obstacles in and around rivers and fast streams, using its tail as a prop to extend the reach of its strong claws. It also uses its beak to assist in climbing.  It has been reported to climb trees and bushes.  These turtles generally move more during the night, and are not prone to moving long distances.  They have a general daily range of 0-89.6m and males tend to move further than the females in this species. They are not  strong swimmers, and when swimming, this species occasionally arches its tail in the manner of a scorpion. The big-headed turtle cannot pull its head in its shell. That being the case, it will not hesitate to use its powerful jaws to defend itself.  It's diet consists of fish, snails and worms.

Exploitation
The big-headed turtle is readily consumed in Asia and is frequently a market item. Hunters capture them on lines with baited straight pins, so this species is rapidly disappearing in the wild. The species is also threatened by its use in the pet trade.

Subspecies
P. m. megacephalum, China, 1831
P. m. peguense, Myanmar and Thailand, 1870
P. m. shiui, Cambodia, Laos and Vietnam, 1987

In addition, two other subspecies, P. m. tristernalis (1984) and P. m. vogeli (1969), have been given, but may be invalid.

References 

 * Pritchard, D. 1979. Encyclopedia of Turtles. New Jersey: T.F.H. Publications, Inc. Ltd.
Bibliography

External links 

 Big-headed turtle (Platysternidae)
 (Chinese) Big-headed turtle
 (Spanish) Platysternon megacephalum

Testudinoidea

Turtles of Asia
Reptiles of Cambodia
Reptiles of China
Reptiles of Hong Kong
Reptiles of Laos
Reptiles of Myanmar
Reptiles of Thailand
Reptiles of Vietnam
Reptiles described in 1831
Taxa named by John Edward Gray
Taxonomy articles created by Polbot
Critically endangered fauna of China